MetalCraft Marine (MCM) is an aluminum boat manufacturer located in Kingston, Ontario. In 2012 MCM opened a facility in Cape Vincent, New York after operating in Clayton, New York for many years.

Founded in 1987 by Tom Wroe and Montgomery Smith, MCM has built vessels for organizations and municipal fire departments. Known primarily for their fireboats, MCM also builds work-boats, patrol boats, barges and research vessels. MetalCraft's American subsidiary won a contract with the United States Coast Guard to deliver up to 10 Long Range Interceptor (LRI-II) vessels, which replace the previous LRI test vessels.

MetalCraft is best known for its high-speed fire-boat, the FireStorm, currently used by the Tampa, Florida Fire Department, the Jacksonville Fire Department, the Boston Fire Department The Wilmington, Delaware Fire Department, the Houston Port Authority  has three Firestorm 70' vessels, Melbourne, Australia has a Firestorm 12M.

References

Canadian brands
Canadian boat builders
American boat builders
Vehicle manufacturing companies established in 1987